The River Lune Navigation Act 1749 is an act of parliament passed by the Parliament of Great Britain. The act recognised the emergence of the Port of Lancaster as a "very considerable" port involved in foreign trade, particularly the slave trade, referred to as the West Indies trade. The act referred to   "the great Advancement of the Revenue, and the Improvement of the Trade and Navigation of this Kingdom" that this facilitated.

With the consent of James Fenton – the incumbent vicar of Priory Church of St Mary, the parish church of Lancaster, a certain portion of the vicarage lands should be used to create a quay, with an annual some of 14 guineas being paid to the vicar.

The Act provided a schedule of duties to be raised from shipping coming in and out of the Port of Lancaster.

Provision was made for the setting up of the Lancaster Port Commission, with 16 commissioners empowered to manage the quay, collect the duties and ensure that proper accounts for these transactions are maintained.

References

Great Britain Acts of Parliament 1749
Slave trade legislation
Lancaster, Lancashire